State Magazine is a digital magazine published by the U.S. Department of State's Bureau of Global Talent Management. Its mission is to acquaint Department of State employees at home and abroad with developments affecting operations and personnel, and to facilitate communication between management and employees.

The interactive magazine was published 11 times per year, with a combined July and August issue, and features news of interest to employees, retirees and the general public. In October 2015 the print edition was cancelled and it became online-only publication.

History 

The first Foreign Service News Letter was dated March 20, 1947, and was published monthly by the office of the Director General of the United States Foreign Service to "acquaint members of the Foreign Service with plans and developments of interest to or which may affect operations or personnel in the field." The Foreign Service News Letter's final issue, Number 170, was dated April 15, 1961.

A Department Notice dated April 21, 1961, announced that "the Foreign Service News Letter, formerly published by the Director General of the Foreign Service, will be retitled the Department of State News Letter and published by the Bureau of Administration, effective with the issue of May 15, 1961." In its new form, the News Letter was intended to "acquaint the Department's officers and employees, at home and abroad, with developments of interest which may affect operations or personnel."

Issue number 1 of the Department of State News Letter appeared on May 16, 1961. The final issue, number 229, was published in December, 1980. It was immediately succeeded by the January, 1981, publication of State, which continued the News Letter's numbering with issues 230-378. In 1996, with the June/July issue (number 379), the publication became State Magazine.

The 500th issue of State Magazine was published in April 2006. The occasion was marked with a revamped design and a retrospective article that recounted major events covered during the preceding 45 years.

Citing fiscal and environmental benefits, State Magazine transitioned to a dynamic digital-only multimedia publication available online and via mobile app on web-enabled Apple iOS and Android devices, beginning with the October 2015 issue.

Regular segments 
 From the D.G.: A monthly column written by the Director General of the Foreign Service
 Diversity Notes: Written each month by the director of the Department of State's Office of Civil Rights
 Post of the Month: A monthly spotlight on an embassy, diplomatic mission or consulate with special insight on the host city
 Office Spotlight: Focuses on one of the Department's unique offices
 In the News: Short news article from around the Department
 Appointments, Retirements and Obituaries: A listing of personnel actions and announcements
 End State: A back-page photo spread highlighting a location featured in the issue
 Lying in State: Each issue features a cartoon of humorous characters and situations inspired by life at the Department of State

Online editions 
The browser edition of State Magazine can be found on the State Magazine page of the Department of State's website.

See also 
 Diplomatic missions of the United States
 United States Foreign Service

References

External links
 
 United States Department of State 
 United States Government Printing Office

1947 establishments in Washington, D.C.
2015 disestablishments in Washington, D.C.
News magazines published in the United States
Online magazines published in the United States
Defunct magazines published in the United States
State Department
Magazines established in 1947
Magazines disestablished in 2015
Magazines published in Washington, D.C.
Online magazines with defunct print editions
United States Department of State publications